Ed Bates is a scholar of human rights and international law at the University of Southampton.

Works

References

Academics of the University of Southampton
Year of birth missing (living people)
Living people